Aizkalne Parish is an administrative unit of the Preiļi Municipality, Latvia.

References 

 

Parishes of Latvia
Preiļi Municipality